Organization for the Reconstruction of the Communist Party (Marxist–Leninist) (in Portuguese: Organização para a Reconstrução do Partido Comunista (Marxista-Leninista)) was a communist group in Portugal led by Francisco Martins Rodrigues. ORPC(ML) was formed in 1975.

ORPC(ML) published Causa Operária.

In 1976 ORPC(ML) merged with the Portuguese Marxist-Leninist Communist Organization (OCMLP) and the Portuguese Marxist-Leninist Committee (CMLP, former PUP) to form the Portuguese Communist Party (Reconstructed) (PCP(R)).

Defunct communist parties in Portugal